Daniel Chiriac (born June 8, 1973 in Constanța) is a former Romanian rugby union player. He played as a lock.

Club career
During his career, Chiriac played for RCJ Farul Constanța in Romania with whom he played in European competitions.

International career
Chiriac received five caps for Romania, from his debut in 1999 against Scotland to his last game in 2001 against Netherlands. He was a member of the national side for the 5th Rugby World Cup in 1999, where he played three matches in the East Group against Australia, USA and Ireland.

References

External links
 
 
 

1973 births
Living people
Romanian rugby union players
Romania international rugby union players
Rugby union locks
RCJ Farul Constanța players
People from Constanța